Jamaal Anthony Bowman (born April 1, 1976) is an American politician and educator serving as the U.S. representative for  since 2021. The district covers much of the north Bronx, as well as the southern half of Westchester County, including Mount Vernon, New Rochelle and Bowman's hometown of Yonkers.

Bowman is the founder and former principal of the Cornerstone Academy for Social Action, a public middle school in Eastchester, Bronx. He is a member of the Lower Hudson Valley chapter of the Democratic Socialists of America. He defeated 16-term incumbent Eliot Engel in the 2020 Democratic primary.

Bowman is a member of The Squad, a faction of progressive House Democrats.

Early life and education 

Bowman was born in Manhattan, a borough of New York City. He lived with his grandmother in the East River Houses in East Harlem during the week and with his mother and sisters in Yorkville on weekends. His grandmother died when he was eight years old. At age 16, he moved with his family to Sayreville, New Jersey. He attended Sayreville War Memorial High School, where he played on the football team.

Bowman briefly attended Potomac State Junior College before earning a Bachelor of Arts in sports management from the University of New Haven in 1999. He played college football for the New Haven Chargers. Bowman later earned a Master of Arts in counseling from Mercy College and a Doctor of Education in educational leadership from Manhattanville College.

Teaching career

After earning his undergraduate degree, Bowman decided not to pursue a career in sports management. Upon the suggestion of a family friend who worked for the New York City Department of Education, Bowman began working as an educator. His first job was as a crisis management teacher in a South Bronx elementary school. In 2009, he founded Cornerstone Academy for Social Action, a public middle school in the Bronx.

Bowman became a leading advocate against standardized testing. His blog on the role of standardized testing has received national attention. He has written about high-stakes testing's role in perpetuating inequalities, including the turnover, tumult, and vicious cycle it creates in students' and educators' lives, as assessment performance damages a school's ability to teach and, subsequently, the quality of the education upon which the student is assessed. By the mid-2010s, a quarter of Bowman's students had opted out of standardized testing. He also advocated for children to receive arts, history, and science education in addition to the basics of literacy and numeracy. Bowman's school policy used a restorative justice model to address the school-to-prison pipeline. After ten years as principal, he left the job to focus on his congressional campaign.

U.S. House of Representatives

Elections

2020

Engel had served as a member of the House since 1989 and as chair of the United States House Committee on Foreign Affairs since the first session of the 116th United States Congress. Bowman was inspired to run by the insurgent 2018 campaign of Alexandria Ocasio-Cortez, and described his platform as "anti-poverty and anti-racist", with support for housing, criminal justice reform, education, Medicare for All, and a Green New Deal. No Republican even filed, meaning that whoever won the Democratic primary would be essentially assured of victory in November. Registered Democrats in the district outnumber registered Republicans by more than four to one, meaning that any hypothetical Republican challenger would have faced nearly impossible odds in any case. With a Cook Partisan Voting Index of D+24, it is the ninth-most Democratic district covering a significant portion of New York City.

Bowman's campaign criticized Engel's record on foreign policy and response to the COVID-19 pandemic. Bowman's endorsements from the Sunrise Movement and the New York Working Families Party assisted with fundraising despite being well behind Engel. He was also endorsed by Ocasio-Cortez, Bernie Sanders, Elizabeth Warren, and the editorial board of The New York Times.

Because of the COVID-19 pandemic, a large portion of ballots were cast absentee, but because of Bowman's 26-point lead on election night, news outlets soon started referring to him as the presumptive Democratic nominee. On July 17, 2020, based on their analysis of the absentee ballot count, the Associated Press called the primary race for Bowman.

Bowman's primary victory all but guaranteed he would win the general election due to the 16th's heavily Democratic nature and the lack of Republican opposition. He won in a landslide, defeating Conservative nominee Patrick McManus with 84% of the vote.

Tenure

Upon his swearing-in, Bowman joined The Squad, a group of progressive Democratic lawmakers. He was photographed alongside the four original Squad members and another new member, Cori Bush of Missouri's 1st congressional district. He is the Squad's first male member.

In January 2021, following the storming of the United States Capitol, Bowman introduced the Congressional Oversight of Unjust Policing Act (COUP Act) to establish a commission to investigate how United States Capitol Police handled the storming of the Capitol and to look at potential ties of some of its members to white nationalism. Bowman said that introducing the bill is "critical when you look at the disparity in terms of how the Capitol Police responded to the insurrection on Wednesday, versus how they responded to—not just [Black Lives Matter] protestors this summer, but other people of color, and people who are disabled, historically”. Such legislation came after both Nancy Pelosi and Chuck Schumer called for the resignation of the Capitol Police chief.

On November 5, 2021, Bowman was one of six House Democrats to break with their party and vote against the Infrastructure Investment and Jobs Act because it did not include the Build Back Better Act.

Foreign and defense policy
Bowman was one of 15 representatives to vote against H.R. 567: Trans-Sahara Counterterrorism Partnership Program Act of 2021, which would establish an interagency program to assist countries in North and West Africa to improve immediate and long-term capabilities to counter terrorist threats, and for other purposes.

In September 2021, Bowman was among 38 House Democrats to vote against the National Defense Authorization Act of 2022. 

Also in September 2021, Bowman voted in favor of providing Israel with an additional $1 billion in aid to fund its Iron Dome missile defense system. His vote was controversial among members of the Democratic Socialists of America (DSA), and sparked debate within the DSA about whether it should ensure its members support Boycott, Divestment, and Sanctions against Israel.

Bowman was among 51 House Democrats to vote against the final passage of the 2022 National Defense Authorization Act. Explaining his vote, he said, "it is astounding how quickly Congress moves weapons but we can't ensure housing, care, and justice for our veterans, nor invest in robust jobs programs for districts like mine."

In November, Bowman was one of 29 House Democrats to vote against the RENACER Act, which extended U.S. sanctions against Nicaragua and granted the president several ways to address acts of corruption and human rights violations by the Daniel Ortega administration, including the power to exclude Nicaragua from the Dominican Republic-Central America Free Trade Agreement (CAFTA-DR) and to obstruct multilateral loans to the country.

In July 2022, Bowman was one of 77 House Democrats to vote for an amendment that would have cut the proposed defense budget by $100 billion. On the same day, he was one of 137 House Democrats to vote for a separate amendment that would have removed a proposed $37 billion spending increase in the defense budget.

In 2023, Bowman was among 56 Democrats to vote in favor of H.Con.Res. 21, which directed President Joe Biden to remove U.S. troops from Syria within 180 days.

Committee assignments
 Committee on Education and Labor
United States House Education Subcommittee on Early Childhood, Elementary and Secondary Education
United States House Education Subcommittee on Higher Education and Workforce Investment
United States House Education Subcommittee on Civil Rights and Human ServicesCommittee on Science, Space, and Technology'United States House Science Subcommittee on Energy (Chair) 

Caucus memberships
Congressional Black Caucus
Congressional Progressive Caucus
Congressional LGBTQ+ Equality Caucus

 Electoral history 

2020

 

2022

 Personal life 
Bowman lives with his wife, Melissa Oppenheimer, and their three children in Yonkers, New York. His wife was upset about his decision to run for office for "the first eleven months", Bowman revealed on an episode of The Carlos Watson Show.Bowman is a fan of New York hip-hop group Wu-Tang Clan. He described hip-hop as a "culture that is created by teenagers who were forgotten about, and because they were forgotten about, they were forced to come together and create something beautiful". Bowman drew inspiration from the Wu-Tang Clan during his underdog campaign, and has frequently been seen in a Wu-Tang Clan emblazoned face covering during the COVID-19 pandemic, which GQ'' noted allowed Bowman to send voters a message. In February 2021, Bowman's mother died of complications related to COVID-19.

See also
 List of African-American United States representatives

Explanatory notes

References

Further reading

External links 

 Representative Jamaal Bowman official U.S. House website
 Jamaal Bowman for Congress

 

|-

 -->

1976 births
21st-century American educators
21st-century American politicians
African-American educators
African-American members of the United States House of Representatives
African-American people in New York (state) politics
American school administrators
American school principals
Democratic Party members of the United States House of Representatives from New York (state)
Educators from New York City
Founders of schools in the United States
Left-wing populism in the United States
Living people
Manhattanville College alumni
Mercy College (New York) alumni
Democratic Socialists of America politicians from New York
New Haven Chargers football players
People from Sayreville, New Jersey
Politicians from Manhattan
Sayreville War Memorial High School alumni
21st-century African-American politicians
20th-century African-American people
Potomac State College alumni